Severn Tunnel Junction railway station is a minor station on the western side of the Severn Tunnel in the village of Rogiet, Monmouthshire, Wales.

The next station to the west is Newport. The next stations to the east are at Pilning in South Gloucestershire (through the Severn Tunnel) and nearby Caldicot (on the Gloucester line).

History

The South Wales Main Line was opened through the village of Rogiet in 1850. At this time Rogiet was little more than a church and a farm, and the expansion of the village did not begin until after the opening of the station in 1886.

During construction of the Severn Tunnel, several maps were printed that labelled the new junction as Rogiet Station, although the station was always named Severn Tunnel Junction from the time that it opened to the public on 1 December 1886.

The junction system consisted of a five-platform station (four through, and an up facing bay), a railway depot, and a major marshalling yard. The purpose of the yard was to sort coal coming from the South Wales Coalfield to the London and the Midlands; while in reverse, it sorted goods from the rest of the UK to South Wales.

The goods yard was bombed during World War II, due to the large goods yard facility. From 1924 to 1966 Severn Tunnel Junction was the terminus of a car transport service through the tunnel to Pilning.  The service was made redundant by the opening of the Severn Bridge in 1966.

As a result of reduced coal and industrial production from the mid-1980s from South Wales, and increases in fixed goods formations, Severn Tunnel Junction goods yard and locomotive depot were closed from 12 October 1987 with residual marshalling moving to Newport railway station.

From 2010, Network Rail remodelled the track layout, which in conjunction with resignalling work was due to be completed by 2014. The plan provided improved operational flexibility, reduce maintenance costs and re-instated a fourth through platform. SEWTA invested in improved passenger facilities at the station. The new track layout came into operation on 4 January 2010, with the South Wales Main Line now using platforms 3 and 4, and Gloucester to Newport Line platforms 1 and 2. There are no rail connections between the platforms east of the station as high-speed  crossovers have been provided to the west.

Electrification 

As with other parts of the South Wales Main Line, the road bridge and footbridge were replaced, with additional clearance above the overhead lines, and with raised and solid parapets to the bridges to prevent vandalism of the equipment. Class 800/802 stock now operates through the station, although no electric services are scheduled to stop here.

Services
The station is served by two main routes -  Transport for Wales'  to Cardiff Central and  via  local service and Great Western Railway's Cardiff to  via Bristol line. Both run hourly on weekdays & Saturdays, albeit with some two-hour gaps on the Chepstow line. CrossCountry also provides very limited services to/from  via Gloucester and Birmingham New Street.

On Sundays, the Bristol to Cardiff service is once again hourly (and runs to/from Portsmouth) whist the Cheltenham service is two-hourly.

Marshalling yard

Severn Tunnel Junction Yard was a major marshalling yard for the Great Western Railway in South Wales and the largest on the railway. It was built initially to support domestic coal traffic from the South Wales coalfield to either the Midlands, via the Gloucester line, or else to the Royal Navy dockyards of the south coast, through the tunnel. In later years the yard expanded as a freight classification yard and hump shunting was added. A wagon repair workshop was also built alongside. During the early modernisation era of British Railways in the 1950s the yard expanded. In the 1970s under British Rail though, rail freight moved from wagon load freight, requiring marshalling, to containerisation. As the yard had poor road access, container facilities for the area were built at Newport instead and the yard began to decline in importance. Coal was also worked by block trains directly from the colliery to the power station and no longer required marshalling. The yard closed completely in the mid-1980s. This is often explained as being due to the Miners' Strike and the closure of deep coal in South Wales, but in fact the decline in small-unit freight was much more important.

In its heyday, the engine shed employed large numbers of railwaymen, which in turn encouraged the growth of the adjoining village of Rogiet. The first estate houses in Rogiet were owned by the railway and were only rented to railwaymen.

Engine sheds 

To support the marshalling yard, the junction and the need for banking engines on the tunnel line, a large engine shed developed near the station, towards Caldicot. This closed in the mid-1960s with the withdrawal of steam traction. A far smaller diesel traction maintenance depot replaced it, now only needing to support far fewer locos. This was on the other side of the station, towards Undy. The depot codes were 86E and ST. The main engine shed was located to the north east of the railway station, while the goods yards were to the west.

From 1955 to 1974, Class 08 shunters, British Rail Class 14 and 37 locomotives could be seen at the depot.

The steam sheds, their turntable, coaling stage and water tower were demolished in the 1960s. The land remains empty and derelict although it was used as a storage depot for new cars during the 1970s, and more recently as a works yard during the electrification of the South Wales main line.

The goods yards were located on both sides of the running lines, one for each direction, and used hump shunting to sort individual wagons into trains.

See also
List of all UK railway stations
 Severn Tunnel rail accident, 1991

References

External links

 for Severn Tunnel Junction from National Rail
 of Severn Tunnel Junction
Historic pictures of Severn Tunnel Junction

Railway stations in Monmouthshire
DfT Category E stations
Former Great Western Railway stations
Railway stations in Great Britain opened in 1886
South Wales Main Line
Railway stations served by CrossCountry
Railway stations served by Great Western Railway
Railway stations served by Transport for Wales Rail
Rail junctions in Wales